Infanta Beatrice of Portugal (31 December 1504 – 8 January 1538) was a Portuguese princess by birth and Duchess of Savoy by marriage to Charles III, Duke of Savoy. She was the ruling countess of Asti from 1531 to 1538.

Life

She was the second daughter of Manuel I of Portugal (1469–1521) and his second wife, Maria of Aragon (1482–1517). Her siblings included King John III of Portugal and Holy Roman Empress, Isabella. She was educated under the supervision of her governess Elvira de Mendoza.

In Villefranche-sur-Mer on 29 September 1521, Beatrice married Duke Charles III of Savoy. He had succeeded as the duke of Savoy in 1504, making Beatrice duchess at the moment of her wedding.

Beatrice is described as beautiful, brilliant, and ambitious. In 1531, she received as a fiefdom, from her cousin and brother-in-law, Emperor Charles V, the County of Asti which, on her death, was inherited by her son and permanently included on the Savoy's heritage.

In 1534, she welcomed Christina of Denmark, a ward of her brother-in-law the Emperor, on her way to her marriage with the Duke of Milan. When Christina was widowed in 1535, the Milanese Count Stampa suggested a marriage between Christina and the eldest son of Beatrice, Louis, the heir of Savoy, in an attempt to protect Milan from Imperial sovereignty. Beatrice supported the plan, and when Louis died, she suggested that her next son could replace him. Nothing more was heard of this, however. In April 1536, Beatrice fled from the French conquest of Savoy to Christina in Milan in the company of two of her surviving children and the Shroud of Turin from Chambéry. In May, she was able to visit the Emperor with Christina in Pavia, but without any political result. She then lived as a guest with Christina in Milan, with whom she was good friends. In November 1537, Beatrice was escorted by the Imperial viceroy of Milan to the Emperor in Genoa, but again, the meeting was without any result. She continued to Nice, where she reunited with her spouse. She died in Nice in January 1538.

Children

Beatrice and Charles III had nine children:

Adrian Jordan Amadeus, Prince of Piedmont (19 November 1522 – 10 January 1523).
Louis, Prince of Piedmont (4 December 1523 – Madrid, 25 November 1536).
Emmanuel Philibert (Chambéry, 8 July 1528 – Turin, 30 August 1580); only surviving child and later Duke of Savoy.
Catherine (25 November 1529 – May 1536).
Marie (12 June 1530 – 1531).
Isabella (May 1532 – 24 September 1533).
Emmanuel (born and died May 1533).
Emmanuel (born and died May 1534).
Gianmaria (3 December 1537 – 8 January 1538).

After the death of the childless Sebastian of Portugal (her grand-nephew), her son fought for his rights to become King of Portugal, however he failed and the throne was given to Isabella's son Philip.

Ancestry

See also 
Descendants of Manuel I of Portugal

References

Bibliography
 
 Prestage, Edgar: Il Portogallo nel medioevo, in: Cambridge University Press - Storia del mondo medievale, vol. VII, pp. 576–610, Garzanti, 1999.
 Ricaldone, Aldo di, Annuari del Monferrato, Vol I and II.
 Testa D., Storia del Monferrato, seconda edizione ampliata, Tip.S.Giuseppe 1951.
 Vergano L.: Storia di Asti, Vol. 1,2,3. Tip.S.Giuseppe Asti, 1953, 1957.

|-

1504 births
1538 deaths
Portuguese nobility
House of Aviz
Duchesses of Savoy
Deaths in childbirth
16th-century Portuguese people
Portuguese Roman Catholics
16th-century Roman Catholics
16th-century women rulers
Daughters of kings